Fang Fenglei is a Chinese investment banker who founded private equity firm Hopu Investment and is the chairman of Goldman Sachs Gaohua Securities. He previously served as deputy chief executive of China International Capital Corporation, CEO of BOC International Holdings.

Biography 
Fang is the son of a former peasant farmer who rose to a senior administrative post in the People's Liberation Army. During the Cultural Revolution, he was sent to the Inner Mongolian countryside. He then joined the army before entering Sun Yat-sen University in Guangzhou.

After graduation, he was assigned a job in Henan Province's Economy and Trade Bureau, where he became close friends with Wang Qishan. Fang convinced Wang to establish China International Capital Corporation, a joint venture with Morgan Stanley, in 1995. He then held the chief executive position at the Hong Kong investment banking branch of the Bank of China and the Industrial and Commercial Bank of China. In 2005, he brokered a deal that would allow the entry of Goldman Sachs into China by establishing a securities joint venture with Fang as chairman. In 2007, he set up Hopu Investment Management with Dominic Ho, former head of KPMG China, and former Goldman Sachs banker Richard Ong, and with help from Singapore's sovereign fund Temasek Holdings.

For his role in numerous high-profile transactions such as China National Offshore Oil Corporation's acquisition of Unocal Corporation, and the initial public listings of China Mobile, China Telecom, China Unicom, China Netcom, PetroChina and Sinopec, he has been called China's most well-known and politically connected investment banker.

Personal life and family 
Fang's daughter, Anna Fang-Hamm, is a venture capitalist and the CEO of ZhenFund. She is ranked 21st on Forbes' Midas List. Fang is also the son-in-law of Chinese economist and former Chinese Academy of Social Sciences deputy director Liu Guoguang (刘国光).

References 

Living people
Chinese financial businesspeople
Goldman Sachs people
Sun Yat-sen University alumni
Bank of China people
Industrial and Commercial Bank of China people
Year of birth missing (living people)